Huntsville Independent School District is a public school district based in the Hawkins Administration Building in Huntsville, Texas, United States.

In addition to Huntsville, the district serves the city of Riverside as well as rural areas in central Walker County.  The current Interim Superintendent position is Fred Rush (former HISD Superintendent).

Schools
List of campuses

High school

 Huntsville High School (Grades 9–12)

Middle school

 Mance Park Middle School (grades 7–8)
Originally built as Huntsville High School in 1950. This campus then became Huntsville Junior High.  Later, the campus changed to Mance Park Middle School.  Today it is a middle school campus with approximately 900 students per year attending.

Elementary schools and early childhood
 Huntsville Intermediate School (Grades 5–6)
 Huntsville Elementary (Grades K–4)
 Samuel W. Houston Elementary (Grades K–4)
 Scott Johnson Elementary (Grades K–4)
 Estella Stewart Elementary (Grades K–4)
 Gibbs Pre-K Center (Grades PK3–PK4)

Former schools
 Samuel W. Houston High School 
 Samuel W. Houston Elementary School

Standardized dress 
Huntsville ISD has standardized dress for grades 5–12 adopted by the board summer 2017.

Demographics 
By 2007 a Huntsville community report stated that over 50% of the HISD students are "classified as economically disadvantaged"; this is a higher percentage than the overall state percentage. As of 2007 over 18% of the students do not graduate from high school.

Notable alumni 
Erin Cummings, Huntsville High School Class of 1995 - Television, film, and stage actress and former Kilgore College Rangerette.
Charles Harrelson, criminal and father of Woody Harrelson, occasionally attended Huntsville High on and off from 1951-1953.
Richard Linklater, director, attended and graduated from Huntsville High (1973–1977) and heavily based Dazed and Confused (1993) on the experience.
Rex Wayne Tillerson 69th United States Secretary of State from February 2017, to March  2018 under President Donald Trump.

Racial integration 

Until the 1960s, the school system, like many others in the United States, segregated schools by race, with white students attending one set of schools and non-white students attending another.

The district was fully racially integrated in 1968.  Elementary schools began to be integrated before 1965.  In 1965, students from non-white schools were allowed to apply to attend Huntsville High School instead of the non-white high school, Samuel W. Houston High School.  One of the first African-American students to attend Huntsville High School was Joreen Kelly.  She later became a teacher at Huntsville High School. The first African-American student to integrate Huntsville Elementary school was Janet Smither. (Now known as Janet Johnson)

References

External links

School districts in Walker County, Texas
Huntsville, Texas